The black-throated laughingthrush (Pterorhinus chinensis) is a species of bird in the family Leiothrichidae. It is found in Cambodia, China, Laos, Myanmar, Thailand, and Vietnam. It occurs as an introduced species in Hong Kong. Based on a combination of strong morphological and genetic evidence, the subspecies on Hainan Island is treated as a distinct species by some authors, Swinhoe's laughingthrush (Garrulax monachus).

Its natural habitats are subtropical or tropical moist lowland forest and subtropical or tropical moist montane forest, mostly at submontane to montane elevations.

The black-throated laughingthrush was at one time placed in the genus Garrulax but following the publication of a comprehensive molecular phylogenetic study in 2018, it was moved to the resurrected genus Pterorhinus.

References

External links
 Black-throated laughingthrush video on the Internet Bird Collection

black-throated laughingthrush
Birds of Indochina
Birds of South China
Birds of Yunnan
black-throated laughingthrush
Taxonomy articles created by Polbot
Taxobox binomials not recognized by IUCN